Ochirbat Nasanburmaa (born 14 April 1989) is a female wrestler from Mongolia.

References

External links
 
 
 Women freestyle ranking May, 2013; Rank:1

Living people
1989 births
Mongolian female sport wrestlers
Asian Games medalists in wrestling
Wrestlers at the 2010 Asian Games
Sportspeople from Ulaanbaatar
World Wrestling Championships medalists
Wrestlers at the 2016 Summer Olympics
Olympic wrestlers of Mongolia
Asian Games silver medalists for Mongolia
Medalists at the 2010 Asian Games
Universiade medalists in wrestling
Wrestlers at the 2018 Asian Games
Universiade silver medalists for Mongolia
Medalists at the 2013 Summer Universiade
20th-century Mongolian women
21st-century Mongolian women